Brayden Schnur (born July 4, 1995) is an inactive Canadian professional tennis player. Schnur reached a career-high ATP singles ranking of No. 92 in August 2019. He was a part of the University of North Carolina at Chapel Hill tennis team from January 2014 to May 2016. Schnur turned professional in July 2016 at the Rogers Cup.

Early life
Schnur was born in Pickering, Ontario, to Chris Schnur and Anne-Marie Nielsen; he has a younger sister named Amanda. He first started playing tennis at the age of eight, on public courts near his home in Pickering. Schnur left home at the age of 14 and moved to Bradenton, Florida, where he trained with Heath Turpin. He was part of Tennis Canada's National Training Centre from 2011 to 2013 under the guidance of Guillaume Marx.

Tennis career

2011–13
In April 2011, Schnur won the first title of his career on the Junior Circuit at the G5 in Burlington. He played his first professional tournament at the Futures in Indian Harbour Beach in June 2011 where he lost in qualifying. In February 2012, Schnur and fellow Canadian Hugo Di Feo won the doubles title at the G2 junior tournament in La Paz. The pair also won the junior doubles title at the GB1 in Tulsa in October 2012.

In July 2013, Schnur reached his first professional singles final at the Futures in Kelowna but was defeated in three sets by compatriot Philip Bester. A month later at the Futures in Calgary, Schnur won the first professional singles of his career with a revenge victory over Bester. At the end of August 2013, he became the first Canadian man to win the G1 junior tournament in Repentigny. In November 2013, Schnur won his first pro doubles title with a win over Alex Llompart and Finn Tearney.

2014
At the Richmond Futures in June, Schnur made it to his second professional doubles final but lost to Rik de Voest and his partner. Two weeks later at the Futures in Saskatoon, he captured the second pro doubles title of his career with a straight sets victory over Mousheg Hovhannisyan and Alexander Sarkissian. In July, Schnur reached the semifinals in doubles of the 2014 Challenger Banque Nationale de Granby. At the Rogers Cup in August, Schnur qualified for his first ATP main draw with wins over world No. 94 Matthew Ebden and 9th seed Yūichi Sugita. He lost to world No. 51 Andreas Seppi in the first round. In August at the Futures in Calgary, Schnur captured the third doubles title of his career with Tar Heels teammate Jack Murray after defeating Dimitar Kutrovsky and Dennis Nevolo. In late October, Schnur captured the NCAA regional singles title, providing him with a bid into the 2014 National Indoor Championships in New York. Schnur then went on to take the 2014 Singles National Indoor Championships.

2015–16
In June 2015 at the Richmond Futures, Schnur reached the third singles final of his career but fell in three sets to compatriot Philip Bester. In July, he was part of the Canadian team at the 2015 Pan American Games in Toronto where he made it to the quarterfinals in singles. In August at the 2015 Rogers Cup qualifying, Schnur upset world No. 98 Ruben Bemelmans in straight sets in the first round but was defeated by world No. 76 Lu Yen-hsun in the final round.

Schnur captured his second pro singles title in September 2016 after defeating Tim van Rijthoven at the Calgary Futures. Also in September 2016, he won the doubles title at the Niagara-on-the-Lake Futures with fellow Canadian Filip Peliwo and reached the final in singles. In December 2016, he won his third Futures singles title with a victory over JC Aragone in Tallahassee.

2017–18
Schnur won the fourth ITF singles title of his career in April 2017at the 25K in Little Rock with a victory over compatriot Philip Bester. He captured his second straight Futures title three weeks later in Abuja, defeating Fabiano de Paula in the final.

In January 2018, at his first tournament of the season, he reached the final of his first ATP Challenger at the 75K in Playford, but was defeated by Jason Kubler.

2019

In February 2019, the Canadian reached the singles final of the New York Open, where he lost to Reilly Opelka.  After reaching the final, his ranking moved to a then career-high 107th in the world. Schnur made the men's singles draw of a Grand Slam for the first time at Wimbledon, when he replaced Borna Ćorić as a lucky loser after the Croatian player withdrew with an injury. He also entered at the US Open as a direct entry, his only other Major participation.

ATP career finals

Singles: 1 (1 runner-up)

Other finals

Team competitions: 2 (1 title, 1 runner-up)

Challenger and Futures finals

Singles: 12 (5–7)

Doubles: 6 (4–2)

Singles performance timeline

Current through the 2022 Australian Open.

References

External links

North Carolina Tar Heels profile

1995 births
Living people
Canadian male tennis players
North Carolina Tar Heels men's tennis players
Pan American Games competitors for Canada
People from Pickering, Ontario
Racket sportspeople from Ontario
Tennis players at the 2015 Pan American Games
20th-century Canadian people
21st-century Canadian people